Grua Station is located on the Gjøvik Line at Grua in Norway. The station was opened in 1901 as part of the line.

External links 
  Entry at Jernbaneverket 
 Entry at the Norwegian Railway Club 

Railway stations in Lunner
Railway stations on the Gjøvik Line
Railway stations opened in 1901
1901 establishments in Norway